Bill Carroll (born December 29, 1966 in Wilmington, Delaware) is an American singer, songwriter, record producer, bassist and guitarist. He has been a professional musician since the mid-1980s, and has been a member of the groups No Such Thing, Doubting Thomas, and The Real Underground. As solo artist, he scored a Rate-A-Record appearance on Dick Clark's American Bandstand program on April 2, 1988 with "When We're Apart", shortly after being signed to Hollywood-based Aardvark Records.

Carroll's musical styles have ranged from serious orchestral arrangements (Dune I from 1994's Kohoutek) to television, sitcom, and film scores, with themes like The Mecklenburgers, to what he is best known for: rock and roll power pop. He is heavily influenced by The Beatles, The Who, The Jam, REM, Jellyfish, and less mainstream artists such as Bruce Foxton, Lee Mavers, Kevin Gilbert and John Wetton.

Carroll joined Doubting Thomas as vocalist/bassist in 1997, contributing songs to the band's last two albums, Who Died and Made You King (1998) and their eponymous live recording, Doubting Thomas (1999). He remained with the group until it disbanded in 2001, but as of 2009, Doubting Thomas had reformed for limited performances.

In 2004, Carroll composed and performed the theme for the PBS program The Mecklenburgers. He was nominated for a regional Emmy Award for the song in late 2005. In 2019, he received a Gold Telly Award as part of the international Telly Awards for music he composed for a recycling awareness campaign in Mecklenburg County, NC. He was nominated for another regional Emmy Award in late 2019.

In March 2022, Carroll announced that he is working on an album of new material with co-producer Greg Endy.

Albums
Summer of Light/Get Away, 1986, Alpha Records
When We're Apart/So Lonely, 1987, Aardvark Records
Lonely Stories From The One-Horse Town, (with No Such Thing) 1991, Aardvark Records
Kohoutek, 1994
Cut It Out (with Doubting Thomas), 1998, Oh Very Records
Who Died and Made You King? (with Doubting Thomas), 1998, Oh Very Records
Live (with Doubting Thomas), 1999, Indievision Records
City of Peace Soundtrack (with Gina Stewart and Brenda Gambill), 2001
The Mecklenburgers Soundtrack, 2005
F.T.W. A Tribute To Gideon Smith (contributed one song, "Outerspace Girl") 2010, Scorpius Triangle Records

Production credits
Lonely Stories From The One-Horse Town (with No Such Thing and Kevin H. Short), 1991
Kohoutek, 1994
Concrete Mary, (Concrete Mary, w/ Joe Dorn and Rick Dior) 1999
Right in the Nuts: A Tribute to Aerosmith (with Gideon Smith & the Dixie Damned), 2000, Small Stone Records
Sad Stories, (T&A), 2000
The Mecklenburgers Soundtrack, 2005

Trivia

 Carroll served as an exchange teacher at Southwestern University of Finance and Economics in Chengdu, The People's Republic of China.
 Carroll was classmates with Benicio del Toro, Sean Kanan, and Michael Davies at Mercersburg Academy, where he played in a band with Bon Jovi producer Luke Ebbin; his bass guitar "roadie" was Tool's producer, Vince DeFranco. He attended grade school with film producer Chris Moore.
 Carroll's song "Axe to Grind" (Lonely Stories From The One-Horse Town) was featured with a story about the Los Angeles riots of 1992 on the Voice of America Radio Network.
 Carroll was once in the contestant pool for Who Wants to Be a Millionaire.
 His reflections on REM's first record, Murmur (which Carroll has claimed as a great influence) appeared in a November 1992 issue of Rolling Stone magazine.

References

 American Bandstand, April 2, 1988 
 The Mecklenburgers Official Site
 Telly Awards

External links
Official site

1966 births
Living people
American male singer-songwriters
American singer-songwriters
Songwriters from Delaware
Singers from Delaware
20th-century American singers
21st-century American singers
20th-century American male singers
21st-century American male singers